James Poston, CBE (19 June 1945 – 13 October 2007) was a British diplomat who was Governor of the Turks and Caicos Islands from 2002 to 2005. Poston succeeded acting Governor Cynthia Astwood on 16 December 2002.

Poston was born in 1945 in St Albans, a city in southern Hertfordshire, England. He was the son of an Anglican priest and a social worker. He was educated at the Perse School in Cambridge before going on to attend Exeter University, where he studied French and history. After graduating in 1970, he joined the Foreign Office.

Poston served as the British consul general to New England from 1995 until 1999. While there, he arranged for the then Unionist leader David Trimble to visit and meet local Irish-Americans. He also served the Foreign Office in Brussels, Israel, Nigeria, and South Africa.

Poston died on 13 October 2007 at the age of 62. He was survived by his wife Romey, daughters Izzy and Kate, and son James.

References

1945 births
2007 deaths
British diplomats
Governors of the Turks and Caicos Islands
Commanders of the Order of the British Empire
People educated at The Perse School
Alumni of the University of Exeter
People from St Albans